St. Clement of Rome Parish is a Roman Catholic church in Stamford, Connecticut, part of the  Diocese of Bridgeport.

History 
St Clement's Parish covers southwest Stamford along with a portion of Old Greenwich. The superstructure was constructed in the 1960s over the original basement church built in 1929. The architect of the basement church is not known. The superstructure was designed by the noted church architect firm Antinozzi Associates.

References

External links 
 Diocese of Bridgeport

1960s architecture in the United States
Roman Catholic churches completed in 1929
Roman Catholic churches in Stamford, Connecticut
20th-century Roman Catholic church buildings in the United States